Lars Lindberg Christensen (born 18 October 1970) is a science communicator and author of a dozen books on astronomy and science communication translated to ten languages.

He had a long career with the European Southern Observatory (ESO) and is employed by U.S. National Science Foundation's NOIRLab and the International Astronomical Union (IAU). As press officer for the latter he was leading the media communication of the 2006 IAU reclassification of Pluto as a dwarf planet. 

He leads the Portal to the Universe project, and was the initiator of the ESA/ESO/NASA FITS Liberator project. He leads the Hubblecast and ESOcast video podcasts and initiated the Astronomy Visualization Metadata project, that later became the Virtual Astronomy Multimedia Project. He has received various awards including the Danish Tycho Brahe Medal and the Klumpke-Roberts Award of the Astronomical Society of the Pacific.

Bibliography
The Hands-On Guide for Science Communicators (2007)

References 

1970 births
Living people
20th-century Danish astronomers
Scientists from Copenhagen
University of Copenhagen alumni
21st-century Danish astronomers